Herluf Juhl Andersen (25 December 1931 – 30 January 2013) was a Danish archer. He competed in the men's individual event at the 1972 Summer Olympics.

References

1931 births
2013 deaths
Danish male archers
Olympic archers of Denmark
Archers at the 1972 Summer Olympics